Joseph Ogle (June 17, 1737  - February 24, 1821) was an American soldier and frontiersman.

Early years

Joseph Ogle was born in Frederick, Maryland. Ogle married first Prudence Drusilla Biggs (1748–1777), of Frederick County, Maryland, who bore him five children.

American Revolutionary War

In 1777, the family was living on Buffalo Creek in what is today Brooke County, West Virginia. Capt. Joseph Ogle commanded a Virginia company during the Revolutionary War. He was involved in the Siege of Fort Henry in what is now West Virginia.He married a second wife, Jemima Meiggs or Meeks, with whom he had four children. All of the children were born in what was then Virginia.

Illinois

Ogle left Virginia in opposition to slavery. By 1785, Ogle had settled his family in the Northwest Territory, which is present-day Monroe County, Illinois. Ogle is said to have been the first Methodist in Illinois, and helped found the Shiloh Methodist Church, the first Methodist Church. Ogle first settled on the road from Bellefontaine to Cahokia. In 1796, he moved to New Design, in what is now Monroe County. In 1791, Ogle was involved in a skirmish with Native Americans near what is now Waterloo, Illinois.

Death
Joseph Ogle died on February 24, 1821, in New Design, Illinois. He is buried in St. Clair County, Illinois. Ogle had a son who was also named Joseph Ogle. His son was involved in the Black Hawk War, and died in 1846.

See also
Ogle County, Illinois

Notes

External links
Biggs Family
Ogle Family
Excerpts from Pioneer History of Illinois, Reynolds, 1887
History of St. Clair County, Illinois, Walton, 1928
Ogle History

1737 births
1821 deaths
United States Army officers
People from Monroe County, Illinois
People from Frederick, Maryland
People from Brooke County, West Virginia
Military personnel from Illinois